Griffith High School (abbreviated as GHS) was a government-funded co-educational comprehensive secondary day school, located in Griffith, in the Riverina region of New South Wales, Australia.

Established in 1933, the school closed in December 2018 when it merged with the Wade High School to form Murrumbidgee Regional High School. The school was operated by the NSW Department of Education.

History
The school was opened in 1933 as "Griffith Intermediate High School" at the cost of A£15,000, with the foundation of the main building laid by the Minister for Education, David Drummond, on 8 March 1933. The school was upgraded to a fully comprehensive high school in July 1939.
The school's badge consists of a green shield with the school's abbreviation "GHS" inside in gold, set above a gold scroll containing the motto. The motto, Postera crescam laude ("Later I shall grow by praise" or, more freely, "We shall grow in the esteem of future generations") is from a line in Horace's Odes: "ego postera crescam laude recens". It is also the motto of the University of Melbourne.

Notable alumni
Stan Grantjournalist and television presenter
Andrew Fifita - rugby league player, currently plays for the Cronulla-Sutherland Sharks

See also 

 List of government schools in New South Wales
 List of schools in the Riverina
 Education in Australia

References

Defunct public high schools in New South Wales
Educational institutions established in 1933
Educational institutions disestablished in 2018
1933 establishments in Australia
2018 disestablishments in Australia
Griffith, New South Wales
Education in the Riverina